Charlie McClintock is an American politician serving as a member of the Iowa Senate for the 42nd district. Originally elected in November 2020 as a member of the Iowa House of Representatives from the 95th district, he assumed that office on January 11, 2021. In November of 2022, he was elected to the state senate and assumed that position on January 9, 2023.

Education 
McClintock earned a Bachelor of Science degree in criminal justice administration from University of Phoenix and is a Master of Business Administration candidate at Liberty University.

Career 
McClintock served in the Iowa Army National Guard for 21 years, retiring as a warrant officer.  McClintock began his law enforcement career in 1990 as a Deputy Sheriff for Van Buren County before joining the Cedar Rapids Police Department as an officer.  In 1998, McClintock moved to the Joint Communications Agency for the City of Cedar Rapids. In 2004 he became the manager of the JCA, and currently serves in that position.  He was elected to the Iowa House of Representatives in November 2020 and assumed office on January 11, 2021. He also serves as vice chair of the House Justice System Appropriations Subcommittee.

References 

Living people
People from Linn County, Iowa
University of Phoenix alumni
Republican Party members of the Iowa House of Representatives
Year of birth missing (living people)